Broughton High School Salford was a former secondary school in Salford, England. It was situated on Duke Street in Lower Broughton. The school was formerly known as Broughton Secondary Modern from its opening in 1950. It changed its name to Lowry High School in 1987.

Lowry High closed its doors in August 2000 and the building was used by a local Jewish school before its demolition in 2007.

Mountaineer Don Whillans was a pupil in the 1940s as was Manchester United footballer Stan Pearson

Gallery

External links 
Broughton High Demolition Video

Defunct schools in Salford
1950 establishments in England
2000 disestablishments in England
Buildings and structures demolished in 2007
Demolished buildings and structures in England